McKinley Senior High School is a public high school in Canton, Ohio, United States. It is the only high school in the Canton City School District and has two campuses:  Downtown Campus (mostly known as Early College High School or Timken High School) and the main campus, which is known as McKinley Senior High School. Athletic teams compete as the Canton McKinley Bulldogs in the Ohio High School Athletic Association as a member of the Federal League.

History
The original McKinley building on Market Avenue North was opened on March 27, 1918. The students of Central High School and North High School were moved to the new building. The school was named for President William McKinley (whose home was across the street from McKinley High School) and his sister, Anna McKinley, who taught in the Canton Public Schools for 30 years. When it opened, it was the only high school in Canton. By 1943, it was one of four high schools, as enrollment in the city schools dictated Lehman High School, Lincoln High School, and Timken Vocational High School be opened. As the city of Canton's population declined, so did city school enrollment. In the spring of 1976, the Canton City Schools closed all four high schools in the city. Lehman and Lincoln reverted to junior high schools, and Timken Senior High School and McKinley Senior High School were their replacements. McKinley Senior opened in a new building on the site of Fawcett Stadium.
In February 2015, the Canton City School board approved closing Timken as a traditional four-year high school, thus making McKinley the city's only high school for the first time since Lehman became a high school in 1937. McKinley High School's enrollment peaked in the 1935 – 1936 school year with 4,000 students attending.

Athletics
McKinley competes in the Federal League, one of the oldest athletic conferences in Ohio.

OHSAA State Championships

 Football – 1934, 1955, 1956, 1981, 1997, 1998 (National Champions – 1934, 1997)
 Boys Swimming – 1937, 1939, 1940, 1945, 1949, 1951, 1952, 1956, 1957, 1958, 1959, 1960, 1961
 Boys Basketball – 1984, 2005, 2006
 Boys Golf – 1943
 Boys Track and Field – 1997
 Boys Baseball – 1937, 1939
 Girls Volleyball – 1983, 1987, 1991
 Girls Basketball – 2010

Football
Canton McKinley is 7th in the nation in football wins all-time, with 827 as of December 2017. McKinley is also second in Ohio in win total.

Prior to the start of the current playoff format in Ohio high school football, McKinley had won seven AP poll titles.  Since the playoff format began, McKinley has won three State Titles, in 1981, 1997, and 1998.  They have been State Runner-Up three times in 1977, 1985, and 2004.

McKinley–Massillon rivalry
The Canton McKinley vs. Massillon Washington rivalry is the 13th most played rivalry in the nation, with 129 meetings between the schools. The rivalry is also tied for the nation's 14th oldest, dating back to 1894 and was profiled in the November 14, 1994 issue of Sports Illustrated. The Great American Rivalry Series which features the nation's top high school football rivalries has highlighted the rivalry 11 times since 2006.

Tom Benson Hall of Fame Stadium
McKinley plays at Tom Benson Hall of Fame Stadium (formerly Fawcett Stadium), which seats over 22,500 fans. Tom Benson Hall of Fame Stadium, part of Johnson Controls Hall of Fame Village, is also home to the NFL's annual Pro Football Hall of Fame Game (The Pro Football Hall of Fame is in Canton).

Notable football alumni
Famous Bulldogs include Percy Snow, Kenny Peterson, Marion Motley, Wayne Fontes, Ray Ellis, Jamar Martin, the late Pro Bowl linebacker John Grimsley, Ed Grimsley, Mike Doss, Reggie Corner and Josh McDaniels (Current Las Vegas Raiders Head Coach, former New England Patriots Offensive Coordinator/Quarterbacks coach, former Denver Broncos Head Coach). Famous former coaches include Don Nehlen (West Virginia) and Ben Schwartzwalder (Syracuse).

Basketball
McKinley has won three State Championships in 1983–84, 2004–05, and 2005–2006.  They have been State Runners-Up eight times, and hold Ohio records for most appearances in the Championship game (11), Final Four appearances (23), and Sweet Sixteen appearances (48). McKinley has had several players move on to the NBA, including Nick Weatherspoon, Phil Hubbard, Gary Grant, Eric Snow, Michael Hawkins, and Keith McLeod.

Timken High School
On February 25, 2015, Canton City Schools approved the "one community, one school" initiative by merging Timken High School into McKinley High School (also known as the pre-mentioned Early College High School), giving Canton a single high school for the first time since 1937. Freshmen of the merged schools will attend the Freshmen Academy located at the current Timken High School, while grades 10–12 attend the senior high school located at the current McKinley building. The remaining high school will retain the McKinley name, mascot, and colors.

Alleged religious discrimination pizza incident
On May 24, 2021, head football coach Marcus Wattley allegedly forced an unnamed 17-year-old football team member to eat a pizza made with pork, although the student's religious beliefs prohibited him from consuming pork or pork residue. The Canton City School District  announced that the head coach had been suspended, and later that he had been fired. Wattley's Twitter account was then deleted soon after.

Notable alumni

 James B. Allardice – Emmy award-winning writer
 Mother Angelica – television personality and the founder of the Eternal Word Television Network
 Brannon Braga – creator, writer and producer of several Star Trek films and television series
 Matt Bors – editorial cartoonist & editor of online comics publication The Nib
 Hal Broda – American football player (All-American); (NFL) the 1927 Cleveland Bulldogs
 Dwayne Broyles – former professional basketball player (EuroLeague)
 Kimberlé Crenshaw – legal theorist, Fulbright scholar, and professor
 Frank DeVol – Musician, composer, actor; Nominated for 5 Academy awards and 5 Emmy Nominations
 Mike Doss –  American football player (All-American); (NFL) the Indianapolis Colts, Minnesota Vikings and Cincinnati Bengals
 Sandy Dukat – Paralympic athlete, Bronze medalist in alpine skiing
 Jack Dugger – American football player (All-American)
 Kerwin Ray Ellis – former Pro Football player for Cleveland Browns and Philadelphia Eagles
 Richard H. Emmons – Physicist, Planetarium pioneer
 Tyler Everett –   American football player, former Pro Football player for Chicago Bears
 Ralph Fife – American football player (All-American);(NFL) the Chicago Cardinals and Pittsburgh Steelers
 Randall Craig Fleischer – philharmonic conductor
 Wayne Fontes – Detroit Lions head coach (1988–1996)
 Cassietta George – Grammy nominated Gospel vocalist
 Wayne Gift – American football player
 Gary Grant – Former NBA player for Los Angeles Clippers, New York Knicks, Miami Heat, Portland Trail Blazers and University of Michigan all-time assists leader
 John Grimsley – American football player for the Miami Dolphins and Houston Oilers
 Antonio Hall – Canadian football player for the Edmonton Eskimos
 Ronnie Harris – 1968 Olympic Gold Medalist in Boxing; Former #1 Middleweight Contender
 Trippie Redd – rapper
 Ralph Hay – once owner of the Canton Bulldogs, helped form the American Professional Football Association (NFL)
 William J. Healy II – Former Mayor Canton, Ohio; Ohio House of Representatives 52nd district
 Matt Hoopes – Guitarist for the band Relient K
 Phil Hubbard – former professional basketball player for the Detroit Pistons and Cleveland Cavaliers of the National Basketball Association from 1979 to 1989, and current Assistant Coach of the Washington Wizards
 Dick Kempthorn – University of Michigan football MVP and 3 time college All-Star, USAF (Korea F-86) pilot (Distinguished Flying Cross)
 Reuben Klamer – Inventor of "The Game of Life" and various other toys, Inducted into the Toy Inventors HOF and honored by the Smithsonian Institution
 Jamar Martin – former NFL fullback for the Dallas Cowboys
 Ben McDaniels – offensive quality control coach for the Chicago Bears
 Josh McDaniels – Head Coach of the Las Vegas Raiders, Former Offensive Coordinator for the New England Patriots, Former Denver Broncos Head Coach
 Keith McLeod – professional basketball player
 Rip Miller – member of Notre Dame's "Seven Mules", Navy Midshipmen football Head Coach and associate athletic director; College Football Hall of Fame inductee
 Raymar Morgan – professional basketball player for Barak Netanya in Israel
 Marion Motley – Pro Football Hall of Famer for the Cleveland Browns
 The O'Jays – R&B group; inducted into the Rock and Roll Hall of Fame in 2005
 Mary Orr – Broadway actress, author, playwright; Her short story / radio play "The Wisdom of Eve" was made into the movie All About Eve and was nominated for 14 Academy Awards, winning 6
 Kenny Peterson – American football player for the Denver Broncos
 Brian Pittman – Former bassist for Relient K
 John G. Price – Former Ohio Attorney General, Grand Exalted Ruler of B.P.O.E.
 Garland Rivers – American football player, All-American for Michigan Wolverines football, NFL Chicago Bears
 Nick Roman – American football player
 John Alfred Scali – ABC Washington, D.C. beat reporter; helped resolve the Cuban Missile Crisis. Appointed "Ambassador Extraordinary and Plenipotentiary" to the United Nations by President Nixon
 Don Scott – two-time All American football player at Ohio State University; was the ninth overall selection in the 1941 NFL draft, but died in World War II
 Robert Sedlock – American football player for the Buffalo Bills
 George Sharrock – Mayor of Anchorage, Alaska from 1961 to 1964
 Limmie Snell – soul singer
 Eric Snow – basketball player for the Cleveland Cavaliers
 Percy Snow – Former NFL Linebacker for the Kansas City Chiefs and the Chicago Bears
 Larry Snyder – Ohio State University Head Coach (Track & Field); Head Coach 1960 USA Olympic Track & Field team
 Harry Steel – Olympic Gold Medal winner heavy weight wrestler in the 1924 Paris games
 Blanche Thebom – operatic mezzo-soprano, voice teacher, and opera director with the New York Metropolitan Opera
 Nick Weatherspoon – All-American basketball player at the University of Illinois before a nine-year NBA career that included stops in Washington, Seattle, Chicago and San Diego
 Frank A. Zazula – head football coach at the University of North Dakota where he also coached track and field and cross country

Notable staff 
 Jim Aiken – Coach: Head football and basketball; would go on to coach at the University of Akron, University of Nevada, Reno, and University of Oregon
 Paul Bixler – Coach: Head basketball, assistant football; would go on to coach at Ohio State and Colgate; Director of Player Personnel for the NFL Cleveland Browns
 Ron Chismar – Coach: Head football; would go on to coach at Wichita State University
 Len Fontes – Coach: Asst. football; would go on to coach NFL defensive backs.
 Harry Hazlett – Coach: Head football and basketball; Head coach of the Pro Canton Bulldogs; during World War II was a Major General and commanded the 86th Infantry Division
 Dewey King – Coach: Asst. football; became head football coach at San Jose State, Wheaton College (Illinois), and AD at Carroll University (Wisconsin)
 Harry March – Coach: Head football; involved in Pro Football, President of American Football League (1936), co-founder and administrator for the NFL New York Giants
 Thom McDaniels – Coach: Head football; USA Today 1997 High School Coach of the Year
 Don Nehlen – Coach: Head football; became head football coach at West Virginia University, College Football Hall of Fame inductee
 Dwight Peabody – Coach: Head football; early NFL player with the Columbus Panhandles and Toledo Maroons
 Bob Rupert – Coach: Head basketball; became head basketball coach at the University of Akron
 Ben Schwartzwalder – Coach: Head football; became head football coach at Syracuse University, College Football Hall of Fame inductee

Gallery

Notes and references

External links

 
 Fan Site
 Ohio High School Athletic Association
 National Federation of State Athletic Associations Record Book
 Fan Site

McKinley High School
High schools in Stark County, Ohio
Public high schools in Ohio
Educational institutions established in 1918
1918 establishments in Ohio